No. 528 Squadron RAF was a radar calibration unit of the Royal Air Force during the Second World War, active from June 1943 until September 1944.

History
No. 528 Squadron was formed on 28 June 1943 at RAF Filton for radar calibration duties in the West Country, using Bristol Blenheims and de Havilland Hornet Moths. On 15 May 1944 the squadron moved north to RAF Digby, Lincolnshire for similar tasks, until it was disbanded on 1 September 1944 by being absorbed into No. 527 Squadron RAF.

Aircraft operated

Squadron bases

References

Notes

Bibliography

External links
 528 Squadron history at MOD site
 Squadron histories for nos. 521–540 sqn at RafWeb's Air of Authority – A History of RAF Organisation

528 Squadron
Military units and formations established in 1943
Military units and formations disestablished in 1944